Kerfalla Emmanuel Exumé (born February 24, 1994) is a professional Canadian football defensive back for the Montreal Alouettes of the Canadian Football League (CFL).  He played U Sports football for the Montréal Carabins.

Professional career

Winnipeg Blue Bombers
Exumé was drafted in the eighth round, 70th overall, in the 2019 CFL Draft by the Winnipeg Blue Bombers and was signed on May 15, 2019. He played in all 18 regular season games and finished second in the league with 25 special teams tackles made. He also played in all three of the Blue Bombers' post-season games and was part of the 107th Grey Cup championship team. He did not play in 2020 due to the cancellation of the 2020 CFL season. He became a free agent in 2021.

Montreal Alouettes
On February 10, 2021, it was announced that Exumé had signed with the Montreal Alouettes.

References

External links
Montreal Alouettes bio

1994 births
Living people
Canadian football defensive backs
Canadian football people from Montreal
Players of Canadian football from Quebec
Black Canadian players of Canadian football
Canadian sportspeople of Haitian descent
Montreal Alouettes players
Montreal Carabins football players
Winnipeg Blue Bombers players